Suri Gopalakrishna (born 26 June 1943) is a former cricketer who played first-class cricket in India from 1965 to 1974.

Gopalakrishna was born in Mysore, where he grew up, but he made his first-class debut for Bihar, playing two matches for them in 1965-66. He moved to Kerala to work with the State Bank of Travancore, and after playing for the bank's cricket team in the local competition he was selected to play for Kerala in 1967-68.

He had his best season in 1969-70, when he opened the innings and scored 359 runs in the Ranji Trophy at an average of 51.28, dominating Kerala's batting. He top-scored in five of Kerala’s eight innings, and in the match against Madras he scored his only century.

He played for Kerala till 1974-75. He now lives in Hyderabad.

References

External links

1943 births
Living people
Indian cricketers
Bihar cricketers
Kerala cricketers